The Challenge of the Lonely Sky is a Canadian documentary television miniseries which aired on CBC Television in 1974.

Premise
The series concerns Canadian civil aviation.

Scheduling
This half-hour series was broadcast Tuesdays at 7:30 p.m. from 2 to 23 July 1974.

References

External links
 

1974 Canadian television series debuts
1974 Canadian television series endings
1970s Canadian documentary television series
CBC Television original programming
Documentary television series about aviation
1970s Canadian television miniseries